Lincoln Heights may refer to:

Places
In Canada:
 Lincoln Heights (Ottawa), Ontario, a neighbourhood

In the United States:
 Lincoln Heights, Los Angeles, California
 Lincoln Heights (San Francisco), California, a hill
 Lincoln Heights, Ohio, a village in Hamilton County
 Lincoln Heights, Richland County, Ohio, a census-designated place
 Lincoln Heights, Washington, D.C., a neighborhood

Other
 Lincoln Heights (TV series), the ABC Family original series